Jukka Laamanen (born October 4, 1976) is a Finnish professional ice hockey player who currently plays for HPK in the SM-liiga.

Career statistics

References

External links

Living people
1976 births
Finnish ice hockey defencemen
Ässät players
HPK players
Mikkelin Jukurit players
Oulun Kärpät players
SaPKo players
Tappara players
People from Savonlinna
Sportspeople from South Savo